Dmitry Tursunov defeated Tomáš Berdych 6–3, 4–6, 7–6(7–5) to win the 2006 Kingfisher Airlines Tennis Open  singles event.

Seeds
A champion seed is indicated in bold text while text in italics indicates the round in which that seed was eliminated.

Draws

Finals

Section 1

Section 2

References

External links
 Official results archive (ATP)
 Official results Qualifying archive (ATP)
 Official results archive (ITF)

Singles